The FIL World Luge Championships 1970 took place in Königssee, West Germany. It is the only time that the championships have been held in the same location in consecutive years.

Men's singles

Women's singles

Men's doubles

Medal table

References
Men's doubles World Champions
Men's singles World Champions
Women's singles World Champions

FIL World Luge Championships
1970 in luge
1996 in German sport
Luge in Germany